The thicklip chub (Cyprinella labrosa) is a species of fish in the family Cyprinidae. It is endemic to the United States,  where it occurs in the Blue Ridge foothill and typical Piedmont sections of the Pee Dee and Santee drainages in North Carolina and South Carolina.

References

Cyprinella
Fish described in 1870
Taxa named by Edward Drinker Cope